Howe is an unincorporated community in Jefferson County, in the U.S. state of Pennsylvania.

History
A post office called Howe was established in 1882, and remained in operation until 1913. It was one of two post offices in Eldred Township.

References

Unincorporated communities in Jefferson County, Pennsylvania
Unincorporated communities in Pennsylvania